Francophone Nord-Est is a Francophone Canadian school district in New Brunswick with central offices in Tracadie-Sheila. As of the 2019–2020 academic year, the district operates 34 public schools with 9,031 students and 746 teachers. The district mainly serves Campbellton, Bathurst, and Acadian Peninsula in Restigouche and Gloucester counties, but has nine subdistricts that include Robinsonville, Maltais, Dalhousie, Balmoral, Belledune, Nicholas-Denys, Saint-Sauveur, Bois-Blanc, Miscou Island, and Val-Comeau.

Primary schools

Secondary schools

See also
List of school districts in New Brunswick
List of schools in New Brunswick

References

Education in Gloucester County, New Brunswick
Education in Restigouche County, New Brunswick
French-language school districts in Canada
School districts in New Brunswick